Marija Ćirović is a Montenegrin model and beauty pageant titleholder who represented Montenegro in Miss World 2007 in Sanya, China.

References

Miss World 2007 delegates
1989 births
Living people
Montenegrin beauty pageant winners